This list of Voith transmissions details those automotive industry commercial vehicle transmissions made by German Voith AG engineering company.

Automatic transmissions for trucks, buses, trains and other heavy vehicles
These are automatic transmissions which are installed in trucks, buses, and other heavy motor vehicles:
D200S, D200D, D501, D502, D506 – 2-stage differential torque converter with either a single, or low and high speed gear range(s) and optional hydraulic retarder
D851 three-speed with integral retarder and torque converter
D851.2 / D863 / D854.2 / D864 / D864G – three- or four-speed with integral retarder and torque converter
D823.3 / D851.3 / D854.3 / D863.3 / D864.3 – three- or four-speed with integral retarder and torque converter
D823.3E / D851.3E / D854.3E / D863.3E / D864.3E – three- or four-speed with integral retarder and torque converter
D854.5 / D864.5 / D884.5 – four-speed with integral retarder and torque converter
D824.6 / D854.6 / D864.6 / D884.6 – four-speed with integral retarder and torque converter
D827.8 / D857.8 / D867.8 / D887.8 / D897.8 – six-speed with integral retarder, mild hybrid system and torque converter

T 320 RZ
T 24 R
T 320 R
L 27 ZUB
S 111, T 211, T 311; two-speed fill-and-drain hydraulic transmission with torque converters and fluid couplings
T 212, T 312; three-speed fill-and-drain hydraulic transmission with torque converters and fluid couplings

See also
Voith Turbo-Transmissions
List of ZF transmissions

References

Voith